Francisco Forteza (1892–1967) was a Uruguayan political figure.

Background

He was a medical doctor by profession. He was a prominent member of the Uruguayan Colorado Party. His son Francisco Forteza (son) served as a Deputy, Senator, Minister of Economy and Finance and Interior Minister.

Public offices

Forteza was elected as a deputy in the Chamber of Representatives in 1926. He later served in the Senate of Uruguay.

Exiled during the Presidency of Gabriel Terra, he later returned to serve in a number of ministerial portfolios in post-WW2 governments: Public Health (1945–1946), Education (1947) and Defence (1947–1951).

He was the president of Banco de la República Oriental del Uruguay from 1955 to 1958.

Death

He died in 1967.

See also
 :es:Francisco Forteza
 Politics of Uruguay
 List of political families

References

20th-century Uruguayan physicians
National Council of Government (Uruguay)
Ministers of Economics and Finance of Uruguay
Education and Culture Ministers of Uruguay
Ministers for Public Health of Uruguay
Ministers of Labor and Social Affairs of Uruguay
1892 births
1967 deaths
Uruguayan bankers
Colorado Party (Uruguay) politicians
Members of the Chamber of Representatives of Uruguay
Members of the Senate of Uruguay